Petra de Bruin (born 22 February 1962)  is a Dutch former cyclist.

UCI Track Cycling World Championships 
In 1979 Petra de Bruin won the road race at the World Cycling Championships,. She came third in 3 km pursuit at the UCI Track Cycling World Championships in 1980.

Dutch Sportsman of the year
Petra de Bruin  was selected as Dutch Sportsman of the year.

After retirement
Petra de Bruin has spoken about the years of sexual abuse she endured as a young cyclist, stating that she had a lot of grief every day because of it

References

1962 births
Living people
Dutch female cyclists
Dutch track cyclists
People from Nieuwkoop
UCI Road World Champions (women)
UCI Road World Championships cyclists for the Netherlands
Cyclists from South Holland
20th-century Dutch women
21st-century Dutch women